William Taylor Nagel (August 19, 1915 – October 8, 1981) was an infielder in Major League Baseball. He played for the Philadelphia Athletics, Philadelphia Phillies, and Chicago White Sox.

References

External links

1915 births
1981 deaths
Baseball players from Tennessee
Chicago White Sox players
Major League Baseball infielders
People from Memphis, Tennessee
Philadelphia Athletics players
Philadelphia Phillies players
Jackson Generals (KITTY League) players